Bela lađa (A White Boat) is a Serbian comedy television series broadcast from December 2006 until April 2012 on Radio Television of Serbia. The series was produced by Radio-television of Serbia with executive production by Košutnjak film. The screenplay was written by Siniša Pavić and Mihajlo Vukobratović directed the series. The series is a loose continuation of the A Tight Spot film series.

Plot
The story centers on the former businessman turned politician Srećko Šojić, played by Milan Lane Gutović.

With its 26.7% share of the audience (2.610.428 watchers) it was one of top ten most popular TV shows in Serbia according to AGB Nielsen Media Research.

Cast and Characters
 Milan Lane Gutović as Srećko Šojić, illiterate democratic party leader
 Petar Kralj as Dimitrije Pantić, Šojić's former co-worker
 Predrag Smiljković as Tihomir Stojković, Šojić's co-worker and cousin
 Branimir Brstina as Baćko Bojić, Šojić's cousin. Bojić is Šojić's replacement in season 6 as Milan Lane Gutović was fired from the series.
 Nenad Jezdić as Blagoje Pantić, Dimitrije Pantić's son
 Mina Lazarević as Miroslava Pantić, Dimitrije Pantić's daughter
 Ljiljana Dragutinović as Persida Pantić, Pantić's wife
 Dušan Golumbovski as Ozren Soldatović, mafia boss

Seasons 
 The first season was broadcast in 2006–2007 with 24 episodes.
 The second season was broadcast in 2007–2008 with 14 episodes.
 The third series premiered on January 24, 2009, and included 14 episodes.
 The fourth season premiered on January 17, 2010, and included 16 episodes.
 The fifth season premiered on February 27, 2011, and included 12 episodes.
 The sixth season premiered on January 29, 2012, and included 10 episodes.

External links 
 Bela lađa at Port.rs

References 

Serbian comedy television series
Serbian-language television shows
Radio Television of Serbia original programming
2006 Serbian television series debuts
Television shows set in Serbia
Television shows set in Belgrade 
Works about the Serbian Mafia
Television shows filmed in Serbia
Television shows filmed in Belgrade